Paul Williams (born 1943 in New York City), occasionally credited as actor, P.W. Williams, is an American director, writer, producer and actor best known for directing a series of films in the late-1960s to early-1970s exploring counterculture life: Out of It (1969) starring Barry Gordon and Jon Voight; The Revolutionary (1970) starring Robert Duvall, Voight, Seymour Cassell, and Jennifer Salt for United Artists; and Dealing: Or the Berkeley-to-Boston Forty-Brick Lost-Bag Blues (1972) starring Barbara Hershey and John Lithgow for Warner Brothers.  He also directed Nunzio (1975) for Universal Pictures, Miss Right (1982) starring Karen Black, Margot Kidder, Virna Lisi, and Marie-France Pisier for Legacy Entertainment; The November Men (1993), starring James Andronica, Leslie Bevis, and himself; and Mirage (1995) starring Edward James Olmos and Sean Young for Universal. He appears in the documentary And the Walls Came Tumbling Down... (2003) about the preparation of his unproduced biopic on Pope John Paul II, written by Oscar-winner John Briley.  His memoir, Harvard, Hollywood, Hit Men & Holy Men was published by the University Press of Kentucky in 2023.

Career
Williams graduated from Harvard College in 1965 after receiving a summa cum laude for his seminal study of "The Expressive Meaning of Body Positions" (published in 1974 in Messages of the Body, Free Press, NY).

In 1966, while studying Fine Arts at Cambridge University, Williams, along with Edward Pressman, was a founding partner of Pressman Williams Enterprises which produced such films as Terrence Malick's first film Badlands and Brian DePalma's early films Sisters and Phantom of the Paradise.  As an actor, he appeared in films that he also directed including The November Men and Mirage.

Williams produced his daughter Zoe Clarke-Williams' first film, Men (1997), which won Best First Feature at the Hollywood Film Festival. He directed The Best Ever in 2001. He spent years (2001-2003) preparing And the Walls Came Tumbling Down, with screenwriter John Briley (Best Screenplay Oscar-winner for Gandhi) a film about Pope John Paul II and his role in the fall of Communism in Western Europe. The film was ultimately abandoned in a Vatican scandal.

In 2015, Waterside Press published Williams' book about perception, extraordinary experience and the digital photographic process, Image of a Spirit.

In the fall of 2017, The Orchard released his production of The Amazing Adventure of Marchello the Cat, a feature film made with no cast other than live cats, voiced by Michelle Rodriguez, Jeremy Piven, Jeremy Sisto, Troy Garity, et al.

Filmography
Crew (1965) (short)- photographer, director
Chanzeaux (1965) (documentary) - cinematographer, co-director
Girl (1967) (short) - writer, director, producer
Out of It (1969) - writer, director
The Revolutionary (1970) - director
Dealing: Or the Berkeley-to-Boston Forty-Brick Lost-Bag Blues (1972) - director, writer, actor
Tracks (1976) - actor
Nunzio (1978) - director, actor
Miss Right (1982) - story, director, actor
Can She Bake a Cherry Pie? (1983) - actor
To Heal a Nation (1988) - actor
The November Men (1993) - director, producer, actor
Mirage (1995) - director, producer, actor
Movies Money Murder (1996) - actor
Greater Than a Tiger (1997) (short) - actor
Men (1997) - producer, actor
Charades (1998) - producer
The Best Ever (2002) - writer, director, producer
And the Walls Came Tumbling Down... 2003 - actor, producer
A Cat's Tale (2008) - producer

References

External links

American male actors
1943 births
Living people
Harvard College alumni